The Wallentine Farmstead near Paris, Idaho is an I-house which is listed on the National Register of Historic Places in 1982.

It was deemed "architecturally significant as an excellent and nearly prototypical example of the I-house form as found in the Mormon West and as a component of a particularly fine farmstead, sited well."  It has a row of gabled dormers and an upper door, similar to those on the Stucki House (also listed on the National Register), and these "are said to be the Mormon variant of the one-and-one-half-story, four room type."

The property includes a barn with attached corral, a granary, a shed, and an outhouse.

References

I-houses
Farms on the National Register of Historic Places in Idaho
Buildings and structures completed in 1890
Bear Lake County, Idaho